Touhy Avenue is a major street throughout northern Chicago, Illinois as well as the north and northwestern suburbs of the city. It is named for Patrick L. Touhy, a subdivider who was also the son-in-law of Phillip Rogers, an early settler who helped develop Rogers Park. Points of interest along Touhy Avenue include Loyola Park, the Winston Towers, the Lincolnwood Town Center, Lincolnwood Produce & Grocery, Loeber Motors, Hebrew Theological College, Village Crossing Shopping Center, Pointe Plaza, the Shure Headquarters Building, the Leaning Tower YMCA, the Pickwick Theatre, and the northern end of O'Hare International Airport.

Major intersections

References

Streets in Chicago